In His Infernal Majesty's Service is the sixth full-length studio album by the Swedish thrash metal band Witchery and their third since signing with Century Media Records. The album was released on 25 November 2016.

This album is the first for vocalist Angus Norder and drummer Chris Barkensjö, replacing Emperor Magus Caligula and Martin Axenrot respectively.

Track listing
All songs written by Patrik Jensen.

The bonus tracks, "Eye for an Eye" and "Cloak and Dagger" are from the recording sessions for the previous album Witchkrieg.

Charts

Personnel
Angus Norder: vocals
Patrik Jensen: rhythm guitar
Rille Rimfält: rhythm and lead guitar
Sharlee D'Angelo: bass guitar
Chris Barkensjö: drums, percussion

References

External links
Witchery at Century Media Records
Witchery on Facebook

2016 albums
Witchery albums
Century Media Records albums